Hitchin and Harpenden is a constituency represented in the House of Commons of the UK Parliament since 2017 by Bim Afolami, a Conservative.

History 
The constituency was created for the 1997 general election from parts of several former Hertfordshire seats. Prior to 1997, Hitchin was included in the abolished North Hertfordshire constituency and Harpenden in the St Albans constituency, while the village of Wheathampstead was part of the Welwyn Hatfield constituency.

The seat's first MP was Peter Lilley, a former Secretary of State for various government departments in the Major ministry in the 1990s, who had previously represented St Albans from 1983 to 1997. He announced he would not contest the seat at the 2017 general election. He was succeeded in 2017 by Bim Afolami of the Conservatives, who retained it at the 2019 general election, albeit with a reduced majority.

Boundaries

1997–2010: The District of North Hertfordshire wards of Ashbrook, Bearton, Cadwell, Highbury, Hitchwood, Hoo, Kimpton, Offa, Oughton, Priory, and Walsworth, and the City of St Albans wards of Harpenden East, Harpenden North, Harpenden South, Harpenden West, Redbourn, Sandridge, and Wheathampstead.

2010–present: The District of North Hertfordshire wards of Cadwell, Graveley and Wymondley, Hitchin Bearton, Hitchin Highbury, Hitchin Oughton, Hitchin Priory, Hitchin Walsworth, Hitchwood, Hoo, Kimpton, and Offa, and the City of St Albans wards of Harpenden East, Harpenden North, Harpenden South, Harpenden West, Redbourn, Sandridge, and Wheathampstead.

Minor gain from North East Hertfordshire due to revision of local authority wards.

Members of Parliament

Election results

Elections in the 2010s

Elections in the 2000s

Elections in the 1990s

See also
 List of parliamentary constituencies in Hertfordshire

Notes

References

Parliamentary constituencies in Hertfordshire
Constituencies of the Parliament of the United Kingdom established in 1997
Hitchin
Politics of St Albans
Politics of North Hertfordshire District